La segretaria per tutti is a 1933 Italian comedy film directed by Amleto Palermi and featuring Vittorio De Sica.

Cast
 Adele Carlucci
 Amelia Chellini
 Franco Coop
 Rocco D'Assunta
 Vittorio De Sica
 Tino Erler
 Armando Falconi
 Rina Franchetti
 Paola Giorgi
 Umberto Melnati
 Camillo Pilotto
 Pina Renzi
 Checco Rissone
 Giuditta Rissone
 Ermanno Roveri

References

External links

1933 films
Italian comedy films
1930s Italian-language films
1933 comedy films
Italian black-and-white films
Films directed by Amleto Palermi
1930s Italian films